is a Japanese wrestler. He competed in the men's freestyle featherweight at the 1952 Summer Olympics.

References

External links
 

1930 births
Possibly living people
Japanese male sport wrestlers
Olympic wrestlers of Japan
Wrestlers at the 1952 Summer Olympics
Sportspeople from Osaka
20th-century Japanese people